The Battle of Bonari Pass was part of the Boshin War, and occurred on the 6 October 1868 (Gregorian Calendar), or the 21st day of the Eighth Month, Keiō-4 year (Japanese calendar). The Bonari pass was a strategic access at the limit of the fief of Aizu. 

The battle opposed a mixed force of 800 troops- including former shogunate soldiers (Denshūtai and Shinsengumi) led by Ōtori Keisuke and Hijikata Toshizō, Aizu forces, and soldiers of various northern domains—to 7000 troops favourable to the Imperial government. Outnumbered, the shogunal troops had to retreat to the North to Sendai, where the fleet of Enomoto Takeaki was ready to evacuate them to Hokkaidō. This left Aizu exposed, and facilitated the imperial advance.

Three days later, the Imperial troops reached the castle of Wakamatsu and laid siege to it, in the key action of the Battle of Aizu.

References 

Bonari Pass
1868 in Japan
Bonari Pass
Bonari Pass
October 1868 events